Davin Jamaurie Bellamy (born December 27, 1994) is an American football defensive end for the DC Defenders of the XFL. He played college football at Georgia. He signed with the Houston Texans after going undrafted in the 2018 NFL Draft.

Professional career

Houston Texans
Bellamy signed with the Houston Texans as an undrafted free agent on May 11, 2018. He was waived on September 1, 2018, and was signed to the practice squad the next day. He signed a reserve/future contract with the Texans on January 7, 2019. The Texans waived him on August 31 during final roster cuts.

Cincinnati Bengals
On September 27, 2019, Bellamy was signed to the Cincinnati Bengals practice squad. His practice squad contract with the team expired on January 6, 2020.

Houston Texans (second stint)
On January 6, 2020, Bellamy was signed to the Houston Texans practice squad. He signed a reserve/future contract with the Texans on January 13, 2020.

On September 5, 2020, Bellamy was waived by the Texans and signed to the practice squad the next day. He was placed on the practice squad/injured list on November 9 after having a benign cyst drained. His practice squad contract with the team expired after the season on January 11, 2021.

Tennessee Titans
On January 14, 2021, Bellamy signed a reserve/future contract with the Tennessee Titans. He was waived with a non-football injury designation on May 17, 2021.

San Francisco 49ers
On August 6, 2021, Bellamy signed a one-year contract with the San Francisco 49ers, but was waived six days later.

Los Angeles Chargers
On August 17, 2021, Bellamy signed with the Los Angeles Chargers. He was waived on August 30, 2021.

New Orleans Breakers
Bellamy was selected with the first pick of the second round of the 2022 USFL Draft by the New Orleans Breakers. Bellamy was awarded Week 1 Defensive Player of the Week after his six-tackle, three-sack performance against the Philadelphia Stars. He was ruled inactive for the team's game against the Houston Gamblers on May 8, 2022. The Breakers moved Bellamy back to the active roster on May 12. He became a free agent when his contract expired on December 31, 2022.

DC Defenders 
On January 1, 2023, Bellamy was selected by the DC Defenders in the first round of the 2023 XFL Supplemental Draft.

References

1994 births
Living people
People from Chamblee, Georgia
Players of American football from Georgia (U.S. state)
Sportspeople from DeKalb County, Georgia
American football linebackers
Georgia Bulldogs football players
Houston Texans players
Cincinnati Bengals players
Tennessee Titans players
San Francisco 49ers players
Los Angeles Chargers players
New Orleans Breakers (2022) players
DC Defenders players